is a Japanese professional baseball player. He debuted in 2008. He had 11 runs.

References

Living people
1984 births
Sportspeople from Kitakyushu
Meiji University alumni
Japanese baseball players
Nippon Professional Baseball infielders
Hokkaido Nippon-Ham Fighters players
Tokyo Yakult Swallows players